Mamuka Usubyan (born October 2, 1994) is a Russian Armenian professional boxer and kickboxer, and the current Fair Fight lightweight champion. As of May 2022 he was the #10 ranked lightweight in the world by Combat Press.

Kickboxing career

Fair Fight

Early career
Usubyan faced Dokka Gurmaev at Fair Fight IX on March 21, 2020, in his first fight of the year. He won the bout by unanimous decision. Usubyan then faced Nilmongkorn Ohh at Fair Fight IX	on July 8, 2020. He won the fight by a first-round knockout, the first stoppage win of his career. Usubyan next faced Arbi Emiev at Fair Fight XII on August 29, 2020. He won the fight by unanimous decision. Usubyan faced Stanislav Kazantsev at RCC 8: Martynov vs. Enomoto on December 19, 2020. He won the fight by unanimous decision.

Lightweight champion
Usubyan faced the former Fair Fight lightweight champion Alexander Skvortsov for the vacant Fair Fight lightweight belt at Fair Fight XIV on March 6, 2021. He won the fight by unanimous decision. Usubyan then faced Itay Gershon in a non-title bout at RCC 9 on May 3, 2021. He won this bout by unanimous decision as well. 

Usubyan made his first Fair Fight lightweight title defense against Milan Pales at Fair Fight XV on August 28, 2021. He won the fight by unanimous decision.

Usubyan faced Vitale Matei in a non-title bout at RCC: Intro 16 on October 16, 2021. He won the fight by unanimous decision. Usubyan faced Milson Castro in another non-title fight at RCC 10 on December 18, 2021. He once again won the fight by unanimous decision.

Usubyan was booked to make his second Fair Fight lightweight title defense against the former Fair Fight welterweight champion Zhora Akopyan at Fair Fight XVII on April 16, 2022. He won the fight by unanimous decision.

Usubyan faced Ivan Kondratiev in a non-title bout at RCC 12 on August 26, 2022. He won the fight by unanimous decision, with all three judges scoring the bout 30–27 in his favor.

Usubyan made his third Fair Fight title defense against Aleksei Ulianov at RCC Fair Fight 19 on November 26, 2022. He won the fight by a split decision. Due to the close nature of their first bout, an immediate rematch was booked for RCC Fair Fight 20 on February 18, 2023. Usubyan withdrew from the fight on January 31, 2023, after suffering a broken fibula in sparring.

Boxing career
Usubyan made his professional boxing debut against Pavel Mamontov on July 9, 2022. He won the fight by unanimous decision.

Championships and accomplishments
Professional
Fair Fight
2021 Fair Fight Lightweight (-71 kg) Championship
Three successful title defenses

Amateur
World Association of Kickboxing Organizations
 2019 WAKO World Grand Prix (-71 kg)

Kickboxing record

|-
|-  style="background:#cfc;"
| 2022-11-26|| Win ||align=left| Aleksei Ulianov || RCC Fair Fight 19 || Yekaterinburg, Russia || Decision (Split) || 5 || 3:00 
|-
! style=background:white colspan=9 |
|-
|-  style="background:#cfc;"
| 2022-08-26|| Win ||align=left| Ivan Kondratiev || RCC 12 || Yekaterinburg, Russia || Decision (Unanimous) || 3 || 3:00 
|-
|-  style="background:#cfc;"
| 2022-04-16 || Win ||align=left| Zhora Akopyan || Fair Fight XVII || Yekaterinburg, Russia || Decision (Unanimous) || 5  || 3:00
|-
! style=background:white colspan=9 |
|-
|-  style="text-align:center; background:#cfc;"
| 2021-12-18 || Win ||align=left| Milson Castro || RCC 10 || Yekaterinburg, Russia || Decision (Unanimous) || 3 || 3:00
|-
|-  style="text-align:center; background:#cfc;"
| 2021-10-16 || Win ||align=left| Vitalie Matei || RCC: Intro 16 || Yekaterinburg, Russia || Decision (Unanimous) || 3 || 3:00
|-
|-  style="text-align:center; background:#cfc;"
| 2021-08-28 || Win ||align=left| Milan Paleš || Fair Fight XV || Yekaterinburg, Russia || Decision (Unanimous) || 5 || 3:00
|-
! style=background:white colspan=9 |
|-
|-  style="text-align:center; background:#cfc;"
| 2021-05-03 || Win ||align=left| Itay Gershon || RCC 9 || Yekaterinburg, Russia || Decision (Unanimous) || 3 || 3:00
|-
|-  style="text-align:center; background:#cfc;"
| 2021-03-06 || Win ||align=left| Alexander Skvortsov || Fair Fight XIV || Yekaterinburg, Russia || Decision (Unanimous) || 5 || 3:00
|-
! style=background:white colspan=9 |
|-
|-  style="text-align:center; background:#cfc;"
| 2020-12-19 || Win ||align=left| Stanislav Kazantsev || RCC 8 || Yekaterinburg, Russia || Decision (Unanimous) || 3 || 3:00
|-
|-  style="text-align:center; background:#cfc;"
| 2020-08-29 || Win ||align=left| Arbi Emiev || Fair Fight XII || Yekaterinburg, Russia || Decision (Unanimous) || 3 || 3:00
|-
|-  style="text-align:center; background:#cfc;"
| 2020-07-08 || Win ||align=left| Nilmongkorn Ohh || Fair Fight XI || Yekaterinburg, Russia || KO (Left hook) || 1 || 
|-
|-  style="text-align:center; background:#cfc;"
| 2020-03-21 || Win ||align=left| Dokka Gurmaev || Fair Fight IX || Yekaterinburg, Russia || Decision (Unanimous) || 3 || 3:00 
|-
|-  style="text-align:center; background:#cfc;"
| 2019-04-21 || Win ||align=left| Evgeny Vorontsov || Fair Fight VIII || Yekaterinburg, Russia || Decision (Split) || 3 || 3:00
|-
|-  style="text-align:center; background:#cfc;"
| 2017-09-30 || Win ||align=left| Andrei Chekhonin || Fair Fight IV || Yekaterinburg, Russia || Decision (Unanimous) || 3 || 3:00
|-
|-  style="text-align:center; background:#cfc;"
| 2017-06-21 || Win ||align=left| Denis Burmatov || Fair Fight III || Yekaterinburg, Russia || Decision (Unanimous) || 3 || 3:00
|-
|-  style="text-align:center; background:#fbb;"
| 2017-04-14 || Loss ||align=left| Arseniy Smirnov || Fair Fight II || Yekaterinburg, Russia || Decision (Unanimous) || 3 || 3:00
|-
|-  style="text-align:center; background:#cfc;"
| 2017-01-|| Win  ||align=left| Sher Mamazulunov || Fair Fight I || Yekaterinburg, Russia || Decision || 3 || 3:00
|-
| colspan=9 | Legend:    

|-
|-  style="text-align:center; background:#fbb;"
| 2019-09-28 || Loss ||align=left| Maksim Spodarenko || 2019 WAKO K-1 World Grand Prix, Tournament Final || Prague, Czech Republic || Decision || 3 || 3:00 
|-
! style=background:white colspan=9 |
|-
| colspan=9 | Legend:

Professional boxing record

See also
 List of male kickboxers

References

1994 births
Living people
Lightweight kickboxers
Russian male kickboxers
Russian people of Armenian descent
People from Aragatsotn Province
Russian Yazidis